Densmore Methodist Church of the Thousand Islands is a historic Methodist church located at Alexandria in Jefferson County, New York. It was built in 1900 and consists of a square block with an engaged round corner bell tower in the Shingle Style. The interior feature an Akron plan layout.  It was built to serve the year round and seasonal populations of Wellesley Island.

It was listed on the National Register of Historic Places in 1988.

References

Methodist churches in New York (state)
Churches on the National Register of Historic Places in New York (state)
Churches completed in 1900
19th-century Methodist church buildings in the United States
Shingle Style church buildings
Churches in Jefferson County, New York
Akron Plan church buildings
National Register of Historic Places in Jefferson County, New York
Shingle Style architecture in New York (state)